Gustavo Cristian Matosas Paidón (born 25 May 1967) is an Argentine-born Uruguayan former professional footballer.

Playing career

Club
The son of former footballer Roberto Matosas, Gustavo was born in Buenos Aires, Argentina in 1967, as his father was playing for River Plate at the time. Matosas made his debut in 1985 playing for Peñarol in Uruguay, with whom he won the Copa Libertadores in 1987, as well as two league titles, and went on to play for Málaga in Spain, San Lorenzo in Argentina, São Paulo in Brazil, Tianjin Teda in China, as well as having brief stints with other clubs in Argentina, Brazil, and Spain before retiring in 2001, last playing for Querétaro of the Mexican Primera División.

International
An Uruguayan international, Matosas gained his first cap in 1987. That year, he won the Copa América title with Uruguay after defeating Chile 1–0 in the Final. Matosas was capped seven times in his career.

Managerial career
In 2012 Matosas managed Club Leon. He won back to back Liga Championships before leaving. In December 2014 it was announced that Matosas would be named manager of Club América. He would go on to win the concacaf champions league 2014–2015. In 2015 it was announced he would be the manager of Atlas liga mx team. On 12 June 2016 Matosas signed a one-year contract with the Saudi Arabian team Al Hilal FC.

On 18 June 2017, Matosas was named manager of Estudiantes de La Plata. He resigned on 19 September 2017.

On 10 October 2018, Matosas was named coach of Costa Rica national football team

On 5 September 2019, Matosas stood down as coach of Costa Rica national football team after the team suffered two shock draws over minnows Haiti and Curaçao

Honours

As a player
Peñarol
Primera División: 1985, 1986
Copa Libertadores: 1987

Uruguay
Copa América: 1987

As a manager
Danubio
Uruguayan Primera División: 2006–07

León
Liga MX: Apertura 2013, Clausura 2014
Liga de Ascenso: Clausura 2012

America
CONCACAF Champions League: 2014–15

References

External links

Profile at Tenfield 
Gustavo Matosas – Argentine Primera statistics at Fútbol XXI 

1967 births
Living people
Footballers from Buenos Aires
People with acquired Uruguayan citizenship
Association football midfielders
Argentine footballers
Uruguayan footballers
Uruguayan expatriate footballers
Uruguay international footballers
1987 Copa América players
Goiás Esporte Clube players
Uruguayan Primera División players
Peñarol players
Argentine Primera División players
Racing Club de Avellaneda footballers
San Lorenzo de Almagro footballers
São Paulo FC players
La Liga players
CD Málaga footballers
UE Lleida players
Real Valladolid players
Expatriate football managers in Mexico
Expatriate footballers in Argentina
Expatriate footballers in Uruguay
Expatriate footballers in Brazil
Expatriate footballers in Mexico
Expatriate footballers in Spain
Expatriate footballers in China
Argentine expatriate sportspeople in Mexico
Uruguayan expatriate sportspeople in Mexico
Argentine expatriate sportspeople in Brazil
Uruguayan expatriate sportspeople in Brazil
Argentine expatriate sportspeople in Spain
Uruguayan expatriate sportspeople in Spain
Argentine expatriate sportspeople in Uruguay
Uruguayan expatriate sportspeople in Argentina
Argentine expatriate sportspeople in China
Uruguayan expatriate sportspeople in China
Argentine football managers
Uruguayan football managers
Danubio F.C. managers
Peñarol managers
C.A. Bella Vista managers
Tianjin Jinmen Tiger F.C. players
Querétaro F.C. footballers
Querétaro F.C. managers
Club León managers
Club América managers
Atlas F.C. managers
Al Hilal SFC managers
Estudiantes de La Plata managers
Argentine emigrants to Uruguay
Copa América-winning players
Expatriate football managers in Saudi Arabia
Uruguayan expatriate sportspeople in Saudi Arabia
Cerro Porteño managers
2019 CONCACAF Gold Cup managers
Saudi Professional League managers
Club Plaza Colonia de Deportes managers
Universidad San Martín managers